Moolathara is a village in the Palakkad district, state of Kerala, India. It is among the villages administered by Perumatty gram panchayat.

Demographics
 India census, Moolathara had a population of 9,405 with 4,693 males and 4,712 females.

References

Moolathara